Ana Iris Segura (born 26 July 1991) is a Colombian weightlifter. She won the silver medal in the women's 49 kg event at the 2019 Pan American Games held in Lima, Peru. She also won the silver medal in her event at the 2015 Pan American Games held in Toronto, Canada.

In February 2020, she was provisionally suspended after testing positive for the anabolic steroid boldenone. , her case is being contested at the Court of Arbitration for Sport as she may have ingested it after eating tainted meat and in Colombia boldenone is used for fattening cattle.

References

External links 
 

Living people
1991 births
Place of birth missing (living people)
Colombian female weightlifters
Central American and Caribbean Games medalists in weightlifting
Central American and Caribbean Games gold medalists for Colombia
Competitors at the 2018 Central American and Caribbean Games
Weightlifters at the 2015 Pan American Games
Weightlifters at the 2019 Pan American Games
Medalists at the 2015 Pan American Games
Medalists at the 2019 Pan American Games
Pan American Games medalists in weightlifting
Pan American Games silver medalists for Colombia
Colombian sportspeople in doping cases
Doping cases in weightlifting
21st-century Colombian women